Janet Douglas may refer to:

 Janet Douglas, Lady Glamis (died 1537), Scottish noblewoman falsely accused of witchcraft and burnt to death
 Janet Douglas (seer) (fl. 1670s), Scottish woman who claimed to have the gift of second sight
 Janet Douglas (diplomat) (born 1960), British High Commissioner to Barbados and the East Caribbean since 2017